The 2015 Caribbean Premier League or for sponsorship reasons, Hero CPL 2015 was the third season of the Caribbean Premier League, established by the West Indies Cricket Board. It began on 20 June and ended on 26 July.

This season saw the introduction of a new team, the St. Kitts and Nevis Patriots as a replacement for the defunct franchise Antigua Hawksbills. This season also saw Dwayne Bravo establish the record for taking the most number of wickets in a single season, with 28 wickets to his name in 13 matches with one 5-wicket and a couple of 4-wicket hauls.

Squads

Teams and standings

 Top four teams advanced to the Semifinals
  advanced to the Final
  advanced to the Semi final 2
  advanced to the semi final 1

League progression

Group stage

Fixtures

Knockout stage

Results

Semi-final 1

Semi-final 2

Final

Statistics

Most runs

 Last Update: 27 July 2015.

 Source: Cricinfo

Most wickets

 Last Update: 27 July 2015.

 Source: Cricinfo

References

External links
 Caribbean Premier League

Caribbean Premier League
Caribbean Premier League
Caribbean Premier League